The Duisenberg School of Finance (DSF) was an educational organization in the Netherlands which offered Master's level education in finance between 2008 and 2015. The school was initiated as a collaborative initiative of the Dutch financial sector with local and international academic institutions. Amongst others, the founders of the initiative were Nout Wellink and Minister of the Economic Affairs,  Maria van der Hoeven. The name was chosen by the founders to honor Wim Duisenberg, the first President of the European Central Bank. 

The annual enrollment was approximately one hundred students. An administrative staff of eighteen faculty members was created with the support of the partnering institutions, amongst others Dutch Central Bank, ING and APG. The university is located in the Symphony offices in the Amsterdam financial district Zuidas. The campus of the school is in the Symphony Offices building. The board of directors and the executive fellowship at DSF are also executive board directors at largest financial institutions in Netherlands. In 2015, Dutch Center for Higher Education Information (Dutch: Centrum Hoger Onderwijs Informatie) has ranked LLM Finance and Law programme as the highest ranking professional program in the Netherlands

As of fall 2015, the program of Duisenberg School of Financed is integrated into the school programs of Vrije Universiteit and University of Amsterdam. The program has been named Duisenberg Honors Program at VU and UVA.

Program 
The school offers Masters of Science in four major tracks, amongst them the LLM program in Finance. The program is designed as an expedited and intensive training in finance and law, taught by an international faculty. Masters courses are designed for MS in Risk Management, Financial Markets & Regulation, Corporate Finance & Banking, and Masters in Finance LLM track.

Mission
Duisenberg School of Finance brings academic and industry perspectives together in order to move towards sustainable operation of the financial sector. The school aims to contribute to the creation of a favorable investment climate for financial institutions in the Netherlands.

Background 
On September 7, 2008 several major Dutch financial services companies signed an agreement to partner in financing the operation of DSF. Executive management, including the governmental officials, have seats on the board of DSF or act as the executive fellows. DSF was founded as a collaborative effort of academic researchers, financial companies, legal firms and governmental organizations.

Academic profile 
Courses are typically taught by visiting faculty. Academics from, amongst others, University of Amsterdam (UvA), Vrije Universiteit (VU), work on collaborative research projects with financial practitioners.
Periodically the lectures are taught by executive management of the partnering financial institutions. DSF Policy Briefs are designed together with regulators, professionals from the industry and policymakers. Articles that meet the school research criteria are published in the public domain. Students and faculty publish research papers aimed at critically reassessing the contemporary regulatory environment and efficiency of the financial sector. The Tinbergen Institute cooperates with DSF to work on collaborative research projects.

Notable faculty 
The faculty at DSF are full-time professors and researchers at the partnering institutions.

 Noreena Hertz,  academic, economist and best-selling author
 Andre Lucas,  professor of Finance VU University Amsterdam
 Winter Jaap, dean Vrije Universiteit
 Jon Danielsson, an Icelandic economist teaching in the LSE
 Laurens de Haan, a Dutch economist and Emeritus Professor of Probability and Mathematical Statistics at the Erasmus University Rotterdam
 Armin Schwienbacher,  a permanent professor of finance at the Université Lille 2 and SKEMA Business School (France)
 Timo Busch, professor at the School of Business, Economics and Social Science of University of Hamburg
 Bernd Jan Sikken, Director of Business Development and Innovation at DSF, former director at World Economic Forum
 Merritt Fox, Michael E. Patterson Professor of Law, NASDAQ  Professor for Law and Economics of Capital Markets
 Curtis Milhaupt, Parker Prof. of Comparative Corporate Law; Fuyo Prof. of Japanese Law; Dir. Ctr. Japanese Leg. Stud.
 Enrico Perotti, Professor of International Finance, Former Chair, Finance Group
 Murillo Campello, Lewis H. Durland Professor of Management Professor of Finance
 Ralph ter Hoeven, Professor Financial Reporting at University of Groningen, partner at Deloitte
 Rene Hooft Graafland, Executive Board and CFO, Heineken
 Wim Holterman, Professor of Business Valuation, University of Groningen, and Managing Partner of the valuation practice of PwC in the Netherlands

 Jasper Knol Bruins, Merger Integration & Carve Out Services leader, Deloitte
 Bart de Klerk, Director ING Corporate Finance
 Robert-Jan van de Kraats, CFO and vice-chairman executive board, Randstad
 Joost Kromhout, executive director, Rabobank Equity Capital Markets
 Daan van Manen Senior Director M&A, Philips
 Jaap van Manen, Professor of Corporate Governance, University of Groningen, partner Strategic Management Centre
 Rob Oudman, managing director Leonardo & Co
 Cees van Rijn Former CFO and executive board member, Nutreco, and various supervisory board positions
 Erik Roelofsen, Professor of International Financial Reporting and Capital Market Communication, Erasmus University
 Hans Schenk, Professor of Organisational Economics, Utrecht University
 Joeseph A. McCahery, Director of LLM Program at DSF

Public lectures 
The public lectures are organized by the industry partners.
 William Rhodes, an American banker, and philanthropist
 Aswath Damodaran, is a professor of finance at the Stern School of Business at New York University
 Nassim Nicholas Taleb, essayist, scholar, statistician, and risk analyst
 Charles Goodhart, was a member of the Bank of England's Monetary Policy Committee

 Khalid Bakkali, Director M&A, NIBC
 Jan Louis Burggraaf, M&A partner at Allen & Overy
 Costas Constantinou, Senior Manager at EY's valuation and business modelling practice in the Netherlands
 Kees Cools, Partner Strategy &, formerly Booz & Company
 Teun Teeuwisse Equity Analyst, Kempen & Co
 Jeroen van der Wal Practice Leader Valuation, Deloitte in the Netherlands
 Jeroen Weimer Practice Leader Valuation, KPMG Corporate Finance in the Netherlands
 Henk van Dalen, Former CFO of DSM, TNT and Vimpelcom
 Casper de Vries, holds the chair of Monetary Economics at the Erasmus School of Economics
 Arne Grimme, M&A partner at De Brauw Blackstone Westbroek
 Hans Haanappel, Independent corporate finance advisor, provider of in-house training on valuation and modelling
 Wouter van der Heijden, Director at KPMG Corporate Finance
 Roderick van den Hemel Vice President, ING Corporate Finance

Students 
The school has on average 90 students with approximately 25 students per program. Master's students either study full-time or part-time. The majority of the students are international students, and the average age is between 26 and 28. As part of coursework students normally complete an internship in finance or a related field, traditionally with one of the partnering institutions.

The Higher School of Economics has a dual-Masters agreement with DSF and annually 5-10% of the student body is from Russia. Other students come from India, China, Africa, Indonesia, USA, Latin America, Students from The Netherlands represent around 30-35% of the student body.

Student culture 
It is DSF tradition to open the academic year with one of the students ringing the bell at NYSE Euronext.

Public events
Duisenberg school of finance hosts public debates on topics related to international finance, economics and banking. The debates feature speakers and panelists from DNB, EIOPA and IMF, amongst others. The results of these public debates are frequently used by participating financial service companies as external communications tools.

School management

Executive Fellowship 
The network of the industry practitioners from the partnering institutions collaborates with the school and each other with the Executive Fellows program. The Executive Fellows work closely with the school research for seeking the solutions to contemporary developments (and challenges) of the finance industry. Herman Mulder, a prominent figure in the fields of sustainability was an Executive Fellow at DSF until the school integration into the VU/UVA honorary program in October 2015.

Scholarships and awards 
Duisenberg school of finance offers the Wim Duisenberg (EU) Scholarship, Thesis Competition, Dutch Board Member Leadership Award, Women in Finance Scholarship, country-specific scholarships, Orange Tulip Scholarship, and the ING Loan Scheme. Duisenberg Battle winners are awarded scholarships as well.

Accreditation 
Both the MSc and LLM programmes of DSF are accredited by the NVAO (Accreditation Organisation of the Netherlands and Flanders).

Duisenberg Honors Program 
Duisenberg school of finance,  University of Amsterdam (UvA) and the Free University of Amsterdam (VU) have signed a letter of intent to collectively set up the Amsterdam Universities Business School (AUBS). The three parties closely collaborate in order to create an Amsterdam-based international business school, operating in the fields of accounting, business, finance and law. In the fall of 2014 the DSF board took a decision to integrate the existing Master's  programs with partnering academic institutions. As of September 1, 2015,  DSF was integrated into the economics and business faculties at the UvA and VU.

References 

Business schools in the Netherlands
Educational institutions established in 2008
2008 establishments in the Netherlands
Vrije Universiteit Amsterdam
University of Amsterdam